The House of Komorowski (plural: Komorowscy, feminine form: Komorowska) is an old and influential Polish aristocratic family whose ancestral seat was Komorów in the Duchy of Belz.

History and titles
The first mentions of the Komorowski family come from the 14th century. It's progenitor was knight Dymitr Komorowski of Komorów. Throughout the centuries, they acquired estates and titles. They held the title Count of Liptov and Orawa, which was given to them in 1467 by the Polish king Casimir IV Jagiellon and were later confirmed in 1469 by the Hungarian king , Matthias Corvinus. Later, in 1793 they also obtained the title of Count in Galicia from Francis II, Holy Roman Emperor. After the dissolution of the Holy Roman Empire the titles of Count were confirmed in 1820 by the Deputation of the Senate of Poland, in 1844 by the State Council of the Russian Empire and in 1892 by the Austro-Hungarian Empire.

Coat of arms

Notable members
 Adam Ignacy Komorowski – Primate of Poland
 Anna Maria Komorowska – wife of Patrick d'Udekem d'Acoz and mother of Queen Mathilde of Belgium
 Bronisław Komorowski –  President of Poland from August 6, 2010, to August 6, 2015
 Gertruda Komorowska – wife of Stanisław Szczęsny Potocki
 Helena Komorowska – second wife of Bohdan Chmielnicki
 Ignacy Komorowski – castellan of Chełmno
 Józef Joachim Komorowski – member of the Targowica Confederation
 Maja Komorowska – actress
 Tadeusz Bór-Komorowski – military leader of the Armia Krajowa
 Zygmunt Komorowski – professor at Warsaw University

Palaces

See also
 Komorowski family of Ciołek coat of arms
 d'Udekem d'Acoz family

Notes

Bibliography
 Jana Długosza kanonika krakowskiego Dziejów polskich ksiąg dwanaście, przeł. K. Mecherzyński, t. V, ks. 12, Kraków 1870, s. 622-623